Sunny Joseph (Malayalam: സണ്ണി ജോസഫ്‌‌) (born 18 August 1952) is an Indian politician and is the current MLA of Peravoor since May 2011. Son of Shri Joseph and Smt. Rosakutty. Sunny Joseph is a political activist with Indian National Congress and an Advocate by profession. Currently he is the Chairman of U.D.F. Kannur District Committee.

References 

1952 births
Living people
Members of the Kerala Legislative Assembly
People from Kannur district
Indian National Congress politicians from Kerala